Belmont Grange #1243, also known as Andrew McNett Residence, is a historic grange building located at Belmont in Allegany County, New York. It was built about 1860 in the Italianate style by Andrew McNett, an attorney, Civil War veteran, and subsequently the village's first mayor. The McNett family undertook modifications about 1890 to the Queen Anne style.  In 1923, the property was transferred to the Independent Order of Odd Fellows. The Grange purchased the property in 1937.

It was listed on the National Register of Historic Places in 2006.

The Grange Building was demolished in 2021.

References

Grange organizations and buildings in New York (state)
Grange buildings on the National Register of Historic Places in New York (state)
Italianate architecture in New York (state)
Queen Anne architecture in New York (state)
Cultural infrastructure completed in 1860
Buildings and structures in Allegany County, New York
National Register of Historic Places in Allegany County, New York
Demolished buildings and structures in New York (state)
Buildings and structures demolished in 2021